Cain's Hundred is an American crime drama series that aired on NBC from 1961 to 1962. The series was produced by Vanadas Productions, Inc. in association with MGM Television.

Synopsis
Cain's Hundred follows the life of Nicholas Cain (Peter Mark Richman), a former lawyer for the mob. After becoming engaged to be married, Cain decides to leave his life of crime.  His departure from the underworld, however, prompts a mob boss to put out a "hit" on him, but the gunman misses Cain and mistakenly kills his fiancée Stella (portrayed by actress Carol Rossen).  Seeking revenge, Cain then teams up with the Federal Bureau of Investigation to find and bring 100 mobsters to justice.

The series aired opposite The Garry Moore Show, a variety show that aired on CBS.

Cast
 Peter Mark Richman as Nicholas Cain
 Carol Rossen as Stella Caulfield

Notable guest stars

 Philip Abbott
 Edward Andrews
 Ed Asner
 Jim Backus
 Martin Balsam
 Majel Barrett
 Robert Blake
 Lloyd Bochner
 Charles Bronson
 James Coburn
 Michael Constantine
 Alex Cord
 Robert Culp
 Dorothy Dandridge
 Sammy Davis Jr.
 Bruce Dern
 Ivan Dixon
 Donna Douglas
 Robert Duvall
 Barbara Eden
 Norman Fell
 Harold Gould
 Beverly Garland

 Pat Hingle
 David Janssen
 DeForest Kelley
 Jack Klugman
 Ted Knight
 Cloris Leachman
 Jack Lord
 Gavin MacLeod
 Ricardo Montalbán
 Juanita Moore
 Leonard Nimoy
 Susan Oliver
 Judson Pratt
 Don Rickles
 Chris Robinson
 Marion Ross
 Telly Savalas
 Walter Slezak
 Robert Vaughn
 Jersey Joe Walcott
 Ray Walston
 Fritz Weaver

Episodes

References

External links
 

1961 American television series debuts
1962 American television series endings
1960s American crime drama television series
American legal drama television series
Black-and-white American television shows
NBC original programming
Television series about organized crime
Television series by MGM Television
Works about the American Mafia
Television series about lawyers